Porta Romana (literally "Roman Gate") may refer to:

Porta Romana (Milan) in Milan
Porta Romana (Milan Metro), Milan Metro station
Porta Gemina in Ascoli Piceno, also known as Porta Romana;
Porta Romana (Florence) in Florence